Denmark was represented by the band Brixx, with the song "Video-video", at the 1982 Eurovision Song Contest, which took place on 24 April in Harrogate, England. "Video-video" was chosen as the Danish entry at the Dansk Melodi Grand Prix on 13 March. The previous year's Danish entrant Tommy Seebach failed in his bid to represent Denmark for a third time.

Before Eurovision

Dansk Melodi Grand Prix 1982 
The Dansk Melodi Grand Prix 1982 was held at the DR TV studios in Copenhagen, hosted by Jørgen Mylius. 12 songs took part with the winner being decided by voting from five regional juries.

At Eurovision 
On the night of the final Brixx performed 13th in the running order, following Spain and preceding Yugoslavia. Denmark was one of very few countries to provide a contemporary-sounding entry in a contest dominated by 1970s-style Eurovision songs, but this proved not to be what the juries were looking for in that year. At the close of voting "Video, Video" had received only 5 points, placing Denmark 17th of the 18 entries, ahead only of the nul-points entry from Finland. The Danish jury awarded its 12 points to contest winners Germany.

Voting

References 

1982
Countries in the Eurovision Song Contest 1982
Eurovision